Yagodny (masculine), Yagodnaya (feminine), or Yagodnoye (neuter) is the name of several inhabited localities in Russia.

Altai Krai
As of 2022, two rural localities in Altai Krai bear this name:
Yagodny, Altai Krai, a settlement in Pervomaysky Selsoviet of Biysky District
Yagodnoye, Altai Krai, a settlement in Tsentralnaya Settlement Administration of Barnaul

Amur Oblast
As of 2022, one rural locality in Amur Oblast bears this name:
Yagodny, Amur Oblast, a railway block post under the administrative jurisdiction of  Yerofey Pavlovich Urban Settlement of Skovorodinsky District

Republic of Bashkortostan
As of 2022, one rural locality in the Republic of Bashkortostan bears this name:
Yagodnaya, Republic of Bashkortostan, a village in Iglinsky Selsoviet of Iglinsky District

Bryansk Oblast
As of 2022, two rural localities in Bryansk Oblast bear this name:
Yagodnoye, Klimovsky District, Bryansk Oblast, a village in Churovichsky Selsoviet of Klimovsky District
Yagodnoye, Novozybkovsky District, Bryansk Oblast, a settlement in Starorudnyansky Selsoviet of Novozybkovsky District

Republic of Buryatia
As of 2022, one rural locality in the Republic of Buryatia bears this name:
Yagodnoye, Republic of Buryatia, a selo in Zagustaysky somon of Selenginsky District

Chelyabinsk Oblast
As of 2022, two rural localities in Chelyabinsk Oblast bear this name:
Yagodny, Chelyabinsk Oblast, a settlement in Nizhnesanarsky Selsoviet of Troitsky District
Yagodnaya, Chelyabinsk Oblast, a village in Nagaybaksky Selsoviet of Nagaybaksky District

Irkutsk Oblast
As of 2022, one rural locality in Irkutsk Oblast bears this name:
Yagodny, Irkutsk Oblast, a settlement in Shelekhovsky District

Kaliningrad Oblast
As of 2022, five rural localities in Kaliningrad Oblast bear this name:
Yagodnoye, Gvardeysky District, Kaliningrad Oblast, a settlement in Znamensky Rural Okrug of Gvardeysky District
Yagodnoye, Nesterovsky District, Kaliningrad Oblast, a settlement in Prigorodny Rural Okrug of Nesterovsky District
Yagodnoye, Polessky District, Kaliningrad Oblast, a settlement in Zalesovsky Rural Okrug of Polessky District
Yagodnoye, Pravdinsky District, Kaliningrad Oblast, a settlement in Domnovsky Rural Okrug of Pravdinsky District
Yagodnoye, Zelenogradsky District, Kaliningrad Oblast, a settlement in Krasnotorovsky Rural Okrug of Zelenogradsky District

Kaluga Oblast
As of 2022, one rural locality in Kaluga Oblast bears this name:
Yagodnoye, Kaluga Oblast, a village in Ulyanovsky District

Khabarovsk Krai
As of 2022, one rural locality in Khabarovsk Krai bears this name:
Yagodny, Khabarovsk Krai, a settlement in Komsomolsky District

Khanty-Mansi Autonomous Okrug
As of 2022, one rural locality in Khanty-Mansi Autonomous Okrug bears this name:
Yagodny, Khanty-Mansi Autonomous Okrug, a settlement in Kondinsky District

Krasnodar Krai
As of 2022, one rural locality in Krasnodar Krai bears this name:
Yagodnoye, Krasnodar Krai, a selo in Olginsky Rural Okrug of Primorsko-Akhtarsky District

Krasnoyarsk Krai
As of 2022, one rural locality in Krasnoyarsk Krai bears this name:
Yagodny, Krasnoyarsk Krai, a settlement in Kamensky Selsoviet of Mansky District

Kurgan Oblast
As of 2022, two rural localities in Kurgan Oblast bear this name:
Yagodnoye, Kurgan Oblast, a selo in Yagodninsky Selsoviet of Almenevsky District
Yagodnaya, Kurgan Oblast, a village in Yagodninsky Selsoviet of Belozersky District

Leningrad Oblast
As of 2022, one rural locality in Leningrad Oblast bears this name:
Yagodnoye, Leningrad Oblast, a village in Petrovskoye Settlement Municipal Formation of Priozersky District

Lipetsk Oblast
As of 2022, one rural locality in Lipetsk Oblast bears this name:
Yagodnoye, Lipetsk Oblast, a selo in Yagodnovsky Selsoviet of Dankovsky District

Magadan Oblast
As of 2022, one urban locality in Magadan Oblast bears this name:
Yagodnoye, Magadan Oblast, an urban-type settlement in Yagodninsky District

Nizhny Novgorod Oblast
As of 2022, seven rural localities in Nizhny Novgorod Oblast bear this name:
Yagodny, Nizhny Novgorod Oblast, a settlement in Pelya-Khovansky Selsoviet of Pochinkovsky District
Yagodnoye, Bogorodsky District, Nizhny Novgorod Oblast, a village in Khvoshchevsky Selsoviet of Bogorodsky District
Yagodnoye, Nikolo-Pogostinsky Selsoviet, Gorodetsky District, Nizhny Novgorod Oblast, a village in Nikolo-Pogostinsky Selsoviet of Gorodetsky District
Yagodnoye, Smolkovsky Selsoviet, Gorodetsky District, Nizhny Novgorod Oblast, a village in Smolkovsky Selsoviet of Gorodetsky District
Yagodnoye, Perevozsky District, Nizhny Novgorod Oblast, a selo in Tilininsky Selsoviet of Perevozsky District
Yagodnoye, Pilninsky District, Nizhny Novgorod Oblast, a village in Bortsurmansky Selsoviet of Pilninsky District
Yagodnaya, Nizhny Novgorod Oblast, a village in Solomatovsky Selsoviet of Chkalovsky District

Novosibirsk Oblast
As of 2022, one rural locality in Novosibirsk Oblast bears this name:
Yagodny, Novosibirsk Oblast, a settlement in Karasuksky District

Omsk Oblast
As of 2022, one rural locality in Omsk Oblast bears this name:
Yagodnoye, Omsk Oblast, a village in Azovsky Rural Okrug of Azovsky Nemetsky National District

Orenburg Oblast
As of 2022, two rural localities in Orenburg Oblast bear this name:
Yagodny, Orenburg Oblast, a settlement in Pokrovsky Selsoviet of Novosergiyevsky District
Yagodnoye, Orenburg Oblast, a selo in Yagodinsky Selsoviet of Grachyovsky District

Oryol Oblast
As of 2022, one rural locality in Oryol Oblast bears this name:
Yagodnoye, Oryol Oblast, a village in Krutovsky Selsoviet of Kolpnyansky District

Penza Oblast
As of 2022, two rural localities in Penza Oblast bear this name:
Yagodny, Kolyshleysky District, Penza Oblast, a settlement under the administrative jurisdiction of the work settlement of Kolyshley, Kolyshleysky District
Yagodny, Luninsky District, Penza Oblast, a settlement in Lomovsky Selsoviet of Luninsky District

Ryazan Oblast
As of 2022, one rural locality in Ryazan Oblast bears this name:
Yagodnoye, Ryazan Oblast, a selo in Yagodnovsky Rural Okrug of Sarayevsky District

Samara Oblast
As of 2022, two rural localities in Samara Oblast bear this name:
Yagodny, Samara Oblast, a settlement in Koshkinsky District
Yagodnoye, Samara Oblast, a selo in Stavropolsky District

Sverdlovsk Oblast
As of 2022, one rural locality in Sverdlovsk Oblast bears this name:
Yagodny, Sverdlovsk Oblast, a settlement under the administrative jurisdiction of the City of Yekaterinburg

Tomsk Oblast
As of 2022, three rural localities in Tomsk Oblast bear this name:
Yagodnoye, Asinovsky District, Tomsk Oblast, a selo in Asinovsky District
Yagodnoye, Tomsky District, Tomsk Oblast, a settlement in Tomsky District
Yagodnoye, Verkhneketsky District, Tomsk Oblast, a settlement in Verkhneketsky District

Tula Oblast
As of 2022, one rural locality in Tula Oblast bears this name:
Yagodnoye, Tula Oblast, a village in Kostomarovskaya Rural Administration of Shchyokinsky District

Vladimir Oblast
As of 2022, one rural locality in Vladimir Oblast bears this name:
Yagodnoye, Vladimir Oblast, a village in Sobinsky District

Volgograd Oblast
As of 2022, three rural localities in Volgograd Oblast bear this name:
Yagodny, Rudnyansky District, Volgograd Oblast, a khutor in Osichkovsky Selsoviet of Rudnyansky District
Yagodny, Serafimovichsky District, Volgograd Oblast, a khutor in Krutovsky Selsoviet of Serafimovichsky District
Yagodnoye, Volgograd Oblast, a selo in Yagodnovsky Selsoviet of Olkhovsky District

Vologda Oblast
As of 2022, one rural locality in Vologda Oblast bears this name:
Yagodnaya, Vologda Oblast, a village in Ivanovsky Selsoviet of Cherepovetsky District

Zabaykalsky Krai
As of 2022, one rural locality in Zabaykalsky Krai bears this name:
Yagodny, Zabaykalsky Krai, a settlement in Chitinsky District